The Shimmer Championship is a women's professional wrestling championship in Shimmer Women Athletes, and has also been defended on shows of sister promotions Ring of Honor and Full Impact Pro. Championship reigns are determined by professional wrestling matches, in which competitors are involved in scripted rivalries. These narratives create feuds between the various competitors, which cast them as villains and heroines.

History
Shimmer was founded by Dave Prazak and Allison Danger in 2005. Originally, the wrestlers had matches for competition or personal rivalries, with no prize on the line. After nearly two years, a championship for the promotion was launched. The title was created on June 2, 2007, and it was put on the line during a two-night, single-elimination tournament in Berwyn, IL. In the finals Sara Del Rey defeated Lacey to become the first champion.

Inaugural championship tournament (2007) 
The tournament was held over two nights on June 1 and June 2, 2007 at the Eagles Club in Berwyn, Illinois. The first two rounds were held on the first night, with the semis and final held on the second. The first and second rounds were filmed for release on Volume 11, while the semi-finals and finals were filmed the next night for Volume 12.

The tournament brackets were:

1: Sarah Stock was listed as an 'International Wildcard' entry, having never competed in Shimmer before.
2: Alicia substituted for Serena Deeb, who was unable to make it to the building in time for her match due to a car accident.

Reigns

Combined reigns

See also
Heart of Shimmer Championship
Shimmer Tag Team Championship
Shine Championship

References

External links
SHIMMER Championship

Women's professional wrestling championships
Shimmer Women Athletes
Shimmer Women Athletes championships